Wansdyke was a non-metropolitan district in Avon, England. It was abolished on 1 April 1996 and replaced by Bath and North East Somerset.

Political control
From the first election to the council in 1973 until its abolition in 1996, political control of the council was held by the following parties:

Council elections
1973 Wansdyke District Council election
1976 Wansdyke District Council election (New ward boundaries)
1979 Wansdyke District Council election
1983 Wansdyke District Council election
1987 Wansdyke District Council election (District boundary changes took place but the number of seats remained the same)
1991 Wansdyke District Council election (District boundary changes took place but the number of seats remained the same)

District result maps

References

 
Council elections in Somerset
District council elections in England
Council elections in Avon